Nwoya District is a district in Northern Uganda. Like most districts in Uganda, it is named after its main municipal, administrative and commercial center, Nwoya, the location of the district headquarters.

Location
Nwoya District is bordered by Amuru District to the north, Gulu District to the north-east, Oyam District to the east, Kiryandongo District to the south-east, Masindi District to the south, and Buliisa District to the south-west.

Overview

Nwoya District is one of the newest districts in Uganda. It was established by Act of Parliament and began functioning on 1 July 2010. Prior to that date, it was part of Amuru District. The district is part of the Acholi sub-region.

Population
In 1991, the district population was estimated at 37,900. In 2002, the population was recorded at 41,010. In 2012, the mid-year population was estimated at 54,000.

Economic activity
Prior to 2013, subsistence agriculture and livestock husbandry were the main economic activity in the district. More recently, crude oil deposits have been found and commercial extraction is being planned.

See also
 Nwoya
 Acholi sub-region
 Acholi people
 Northern Region, Uganda
 Districts of Uganda

References

External links
Total SA Discovers Oil In Uganda’s Nwoya District

 
Acholi sub-region
Northern Region, Uganda
Districts of Uganda